Timothy Mohr (born 19 October 1988) is a former professional Australian rules footballer who played for the Greater Western Sydney Giants and the Hawthorn Football Club in the Australian Football League (AFL).

Early career
He was a premiership player for Launceston Football Club before he moved to the VFL, where he played for four years, winning Casey's best and fairest award in 2011.

AFL career
He was recruited from the Casey Scorpions in the Victorian Football League (VFL) prior to the 2011 AFL Draft as one of the new club's selections of players who had previously nominated for the draft. Mohr made his debut in Round 1 of the 2012 AFL season against . He played in 13 games in his debut season before a groin complaint curtailed his season. 
2013 was his best as he played every game for the year, he held down the difficult position of centre half back. He was sidelined early in 2014 with a foot issue, made his way back into the side before damaging his ACL late in the season. In 2015 Mohr managed a few games in the NEAFL before re injuring his left knee and another reconstruction was required.
The popular clubman recovered and but in his second game back from injury hurt his hamstrings and that was his 2016 season done. The improvement of the Giants list by 2017 and the maturing of their young list made it difficult for Mohr to break into the side as younger players were given priority over him.

By 2018 Mohr was seen as a backup player because of his advancing years. He managed two games when the Giants were hit by injuries and was later delisted at the end of the 2018 season.

 rookied him with their third pick in the 2018 AFL draft rookie draft. While playing for Hawthorn's VFL affiliate Box Hill, Mohr suffered a dislocated knee. It was announced that Mohr would require surgery and would miss a "large chunk" of football.

Statistics
Statistics are correct to the end of 2019.

|- style="background-color: #EAEAEA"
! scope="row" style="text-align:center" | 2012
|
| 39 || 13 || 1 || 0 || 98 || 60 || 158 || 53 || 24 || 0.1 || 0.0 || 7.5 || 4.6 || 12.2 || 4.1 || 1.8
|-
! scope="row" style="text-align:center" | 2013
|
| 39 || 22 || 0 || 1 || 239 || 75 || 314 || 104 || 31 || 0.0 || 0.0 || 10.9 || 3.4 || 14.3 || 4.7 || 1.4
|- style="background-color: #EAEAEA"
! scope="row" style="text-align:center" | 2014
|
| 39 || 8 || 0 || 2 || 79 || 31 || 110 || 34 || 17 || 0.0 || 0.3 || 9.9 || 3.9 || 13.8 || 4.3 || 2.1
|-
! scope="row" style="text-align:center" | 2015
|
| 39 || 0 || – || – || – || – || – || – || – || – || – || – || – || – || – || –
|- style="background-color: #EAEAEA"
! scope="row" style="text-align:center" | 2016
|
| 39 || 2 || 0 || 0 || 11 || 2 || 13 || 5 || 3 || 0.0 || 0.0 || 5.5 || 1.0 || 6.5 || 2.5 || 1.5
|-
! scope="row" style="text-align:center" | 2017
|
| 39 || 1 || 0 ||0 || 7 || 2 || 9 || 4 || 1 || 0.0 || 0.0 || 7.0 || 2.0 || 9.0 || 4.0 || 1.0
|- style="background-color: #EAEAEA"
! scope="row" style="text-align:center" | 2018
|
| 39 || 2 || 0 || 0 || 15 || 4 || 19 || 6 || 4 || 0.0 || 0.0 || 7.5 || 2.0 || 9.5 || 3.0 || 2.0
|-
! scope="row" style="text-align:center" | 2019
|
| 39 || 0 || – || – || – || – || – || – || – || – || – || – || – || – || – || –
|- class="sortbottom"
! colspan=3| Career
! 48 !! 1 !! 3 !! 449 !! 174 !! 623 !! 206 !! 80 !! 0.0 !! 0.1 !! 9.4 !! 3.6 !! 13.0 !! 4.3 !! 1.7
|}

References

External links

1988 births
Living people
Greater Western Sydney Giants players
Australian rules footballers from Tasmania
Casey Demons players
Launceston Football Club players